Signau District was a district in Switzerland in the canton of Bern with its seat Signau. It included nine municipalities in an area of 320 km²:

External links 
 Regierungsstatthalteramt Signau

References

Former districts of the canton of Bern